Ameles picteti is a species of praying mantis found in Algeria, Sicily, and Spain.

References

picteti
Mantodea of Africa
Mantodea of Europe
Insects of North Africa
Fauna of Sicily
Insects described in 1869